U Jung-ho (also transliterated Woo Jung-ho, born 19 March 1971) is a South Korean equestrian. He competed in two events at the 2004 Summer Olympics.

References

External links
 

1971 births
Living people
South Korean male equestrians
Olympic equestrians of South Korea
Equestrians at the 2004 Summer Olympics
Asian Games medalists in equestrian
Asian Games silver medalists for South Korea
Equestrians at the 1998 Asian Games
Medalists at the 1998 Asian Games
Place of birth missing (living people)